Cephalanthera longifolia, the narrow-leaved helleborine, sword-leaved helleborine or long-leaved helleborine, is a rhizomatous herbaceous perennial plant in the family Orchidaceae. It is native to light woodland, and widespread across Europe, Asia and North Africa from Ireland and Morocco to China. This includes the United Kingdom, Iran, Russia, Kazakhstan, Turkey, Algeria, India, Pakistan, Germany, Italy, France, Spain, Portugal and many other countries.

Description
Cephalanthera longifolia reaches on average  in height in typical conditions. This orchid has erect and glabrous multiple stems. The leaves are dark green, long and narrowly tapering (hence the common name "sword-leaved helleborine"). The inflorescence is a lax, 5-20 flowered spike with the bell-shaped flowers ascending in an oblique spiral. This plant can be found in bloom from April to June, depending on location and altitude. The fruit is a dry capsule and the dust-like seed is dispersed by the wind.

One unusual characteristic of this species is that some individuals are achlorophyllous (lacking green pigment) and take all their nutrition from mycorrhizal fungi.

Ecology
The flowers are pollinated by solitary burrowing bees. The flowers produce little nectar and the yellowish dust on the labellum which the insects collect is of little nutritional value. The actual pollen is contained in  two pollinia which adhere to the hairs on the bee's back.

An investigation in Estonia determined that the mycorrhizal partners of this orchid species include Thelephoraceae and Helotiales. Another investigation indicated 9 mycorrhizal partners (still fewer than those recorded for Cephalanthera damasonium): Bjerkandera adusta, Phlebia acerina, Sebacinaceae, Tetracladium sp., and Tomentella sp.

Cephelanthera longifolia is vulnerable to grazing by deer.

Distribution
Cephalanthera longifolia is common in some parts of its European range, such as southern France and Spain, but endangered particularly in northern areas such as Belgium. In Britain and Ireland it is a quite uncommon and declining species, and conservation work is being carried out at a number of sites to safeguard it (see also Galley Down Wood). In 2007 it was listed as a priority species under the UK Biodiversity Action Plan. The charity Plantlife International is leading this work in the United Kingdom.

Habitat
Sword-leaved helleborine usually grows in damp woodland places (mainly oak and beech), forest edges and rocky slopes.

This species was once abundant, when forests were used for grazing livestock and trees were coppiced, but is now threatened by overgrowth of larger plants. As the flower spikes are eaten by deer, the sword-leaved helleborine is also threatened by the increase of deer populations following extirpation of large predators like the wolf and brown bear in many parts of Europe.

Etymology
The genus name Cephalanthera comes from the Greek κεφαλή kephalē (head) and ἄνθηρα anthēra (anther): the anther is placed at the top (head) of the column. The Latin name longifolia  means with long leaves .

"Helleborine" may refer to deer using the orchid for food (many conservationists have noted that helleborine orchids are grazed by deer). Alternatively it may denote that the plants are similar to hellebores (a group of species in the family Ranunculaceae). "Hellebore" comes from the Greek "álkē" and "bora", translating as "fawn" and "food of beasts".

Gallery

References

External links

 Pignatti S. - Flora d'Italia (3 voll.) - Edagricole - 1982
 Tutin, T.G. et al. - Flora Europaea, second edition - 1993
 Acta Plantarum
 Den virtuella floran - Distribution
 Plantlife website - species listing
 Naturdata page on Cephalantera longifolia with pictures and information for this species in Portugal
 Biolib
  Cephalanthera longifolia

longifolia
Orchids of Asia
Orchids of China
Flora of North Africa
Orchids of Europe
Plants described in 1753
Taxa named by Carl Linnaeus
Taxobox binomials not recognized by IUCN